N-Methylserotonin is a tryptamine alkaloid.  Chemically, it is a derivative of serotonin in which a methyl group resides at its alkyl amine.  It is also called Nω-methylserotonin (Nω-methyl-5-hydroxytryptamine) to distinguish it from tryptamine-derived compounds in which a methyl group is bonded to the nitrogen atom of the indole group.

N-Methylserotonin is found in plants, animals, and fungi. These include the plants, Actaea racemosa (black cohosh) and Zanthoxylum piperitum, the Green and Golden Bell Frog, Litoria aurea,  and Amanita mushrooms. The compound binds to several serotonin receptors, including the 5-HT7 and 5-HT1A receptors, with high affinity (IC50 ≤ 2 nM) and selectivity, and displays agonist activity; besides its direct interaction with the serotonin receptors, N-methylserotonin also acts as a selective serotonin reuptake inhibitor.

Legal Status

United States
N-Methylserotonin is not scheduled at the federal level in the United States, but could be considered an analog (of bufotenin), in which case, sales or possession intended for human consumption could be prosecuted under the Federal Analog Act.

Florida
N-Methylserotonin is a Schedule I controlled substance in the state of Florida making it illegal to buy, sell, or possess in Florida.

References

5-HT1A agonists
5-HT7 agonists
Serotonin receptor agonists
Tryptamines